Nengi Adoki (born 17 January 1990) is a Nigerian actress. Having appeared in several Nollywood movies, Adoki was named one of the Top Nollywood actors in 2021 and has used her platform to speak out about issues facing women in Nigeria.

Career 
Nengi is the lead cast in the 2022 film chartroom, a film that focus on women violation and abuse written by Chike Ibekwe. The Nigerian-Toronto actress in an interview with Eelive said since she featured in the Men's club, her fan base has increased.

Filmography 
Juju Stories

Death and the King's Horseman

Baby Drama

Little black book

Heart the musical

The Men's club

Back to school

Inspector K

Chartroom

Nomination and award 
Nengi was nominated at the 16th edition of the Future Awards Africa ceremony, an event to honour youth between the age of 18-31. She was nominated Under the category of acting for the movie juju stories.

See also 
 Bimbo Ademoye
 Abayomi Alvin
 Last request (2019 film)

References 

 

Nigerian film actresses
Living people

1990 births